Glenton Wolfe (born 30 December 1981) is a Trinidadian professional footballer who plays as a defender for Sporting Clube de Goa in the I-League.

Career

TT Pro League
Wolfe started his career with North East Stars of the TT Pro League before moving to San Juan Jabloteh. He soon returned to North East Stars before signing for San Juan again and then W Connection. He then moved back to North East Stars, where he stayed till 2014.

India
In 2014, Wolfe moved to India to sign for Churchill Brothers S.C. of the I-League, and also the club of his brother, Anthony Wolfe. Shortly after Churchill Brothers were relegated, Wolfe signed for rivals Sporting Clube de Goa.

International
Making his debut on 25 May 2005, Wolfe has 5 caps for the Trinidad and Tobago national football team.

References

1981 births
Living people
Trinidad and Tobago footballers
Trinidad and Tobago international footballers
Churchill Brothers FC Goa players
Sporting Clube de Goa players
Association football defenders
Expatriate footballers in India